Tetsuhide Sasaki (born 6 June 1945) is a Japanese weightlifter. He competed in the men's flyweight event at the 1972 Summer Olympics.

References

1945 births
Living people
Japanese male weightlifters
Olympic weightlifters of Japan
Weightlifters at the 1972 Summer Olympics
Place of birth missing (living people)
Asian Games medalists in weightlifting
Asian Games silver medalists for Japan
Weightlifters at the 1966 Asian Games
Medalists at the 1966 Asian Games
20th-century Japanese people
21st-century Japanese people